James Spence Medal is a medal that was first struck in 1960, six years after the death of the paediatrician James Calvert Spence and is awarded for outstanding contributions to the advancement or clarification of paediatric knowledge and is the highest honour bestowed by The Royal College of Paediatrics and Child Health.

Recipients

See also

 List of medicine awards

References

Awards established in 1960
British science and technology awards
Medicine awards
Paediatrics in the United Kingdom